Kalhu Dasht may refer to:
 Kalhu Dasht-e Bala
 Kalhu Dasht-e Pain